Harry Handworth (1878 –  March 22, 1916) was a silent film actor and director from the United States.

He died from pneumonia in 1916.

Selected filmography
 Anselo Lee (1915)

References

External links
Harry Handworth; kinotv.com

1878 births
1916 deaths
American male silent film actors
American film directors
20th-century American male actors
Deaths from pneumonia in New York City